The Ogooué (or Ogowe), also known as the Nazareth river, some  long, is the principal river of Gabon in west central Africa and the fifth largest river in Africa by volume of discharge, trailing only the Congo, Kasai, Niger and Zambezi. Its watershed drains nearly the entire country of Gabon, with some tributaries reaching into the Republic of the Congo, Cameroon, and Equatorial Guinea.

Course 
The source of the Ogooué River was discovered in 1894 by Mary Kingsley, an English explorer who travelled up the banks by steamboat and canoe. The river rises in the northwest of the Bateke Plateaux near Kengue, Republic of Congo. It runs northwest, and enters Gabon near Boumango. Poubara Falls are near Maulongo. From Lastoursville up to Ndjole, the Ogooué is non-navigable due to rapids. From the latter city, it runs west, and enters the Gulf of Guinea near Ozouri, south of Port Gentil. The Ogowe Delta is quite large, about 100 km long and 100 km wide.

Basin 
It mostly consists of undisturbed rainforest with some savanna grassland where the mid-year dry season is longest. It is home to a high biodiversity. All three species of African crocodile, for instance, occur in the river: the Nile crocodile, the dwarf crocodile, and the slender-snouted crocodile. It is also the type locality for the catfish Synodontis acanthoperca.

The Mpassa River is a tributary of the Ogooué River. The Ndjoumou River is the main tributary of Mpassa River.

Distance from river mouth

Economy 
The Ogooué is navigable from Ndjole to the sea. It is used to bring wood to the Port Gentil Harbour.

The Ogowe Basin includes several major conservation reserves, including Lope National Park.

The catchment area has an average population density of 4 people per km². Towns along the river include Ayem, Adané, Loanda, Lambaréné, Ndjole, Booué, Kankan, Maulongo, Mboungou-Mbadouma, Ndoro, Lastoursville, Moanda, and Franceville near the Congo border.

Towns in Congo include Zanaga.

The first European explorer to trace the river to its source was Pierre Savorgnan de Brazza, who traveled in the area in the 1870s.

Tributaries 

The Ogowe River receives water of numerous tributaries including:

 Abanga, which rises in the Cristal Mountains, near Medouneu
 Baniaka
 Dilo
 Iyinda, the most important tributary
 Letili
 Lassio
 Lebombi
 Lekabi
 Lekedi
 Lekoni, which flows across Akieni and Leconi
 Letili
 Leyou
 Lolo
 Mbine
 Ngolo
 Ngounie
 Nke
 Offoue
 Okano, whose main tributary is the Lara River
 Mpassa, which flows across Franceville
 Sebe, which flows past Okondja
 Wagny

List of major tributaries

The main river and tributaries are (sorted in order from the mouth heading upstream):

References 

 Perusset André. 1983. Oro-Hydrographie (Le Relief) in Geographie et Cartographie du Gabon, Atlas Illustré led by The Ministère de l'Education Nationale de la Republique Gabonaise. Pg 10-13. Paris, France: Edicef.
 Petringa, Maria. Brazza, A Life for Africa. Bloomington, IN: AuthorHouse, 2006. .  Describes Pierre Savorgnan de Brazza's extensive explorations of the Ogoué River basin.
 National Geographic. 2003. African Adventure Atlas Pg 24,72. led by Sean Fraser.
 Gardinier David. 1994. Historical Dictionary of Gabon 2nd Edition. USA: The Scarercrow Press, Inc.
 Direction General de L'Environnement.1999. Stratégie nationale et Plan D'action sur la biodiversité biologique du Gabon.
 The Atlas of Africa. Pg 201. by Regine Van Chi-Bonnardel. Jeune Afrique Editions.
 Lerique Jacques. 1983. Hydrographie-Hydrologie. in Geographie et Cartographie du Gabon, Atlas Illustré led by The Ministère de l'Education Nationale de la Republique Gabonaise. Pg 14-15. Paris, France: Edicef.

External links 

 World Resources Institute map of Ogooué watershed
 Map of the Ogoué River basin at Water Resources eAtlas
 Maria Petringa's 1997 "Pierre Savorgnan de Brazza: Brief Life of a Lover of Africa" about Brazza's extensive explorations of the Ogoué River basin
 Website about the dinosaur hunt

 
Rivers of Gabon
International rivers of Africa
Rivers of the Republic of the Congo
Ramsar sites in Gabon